Alphonse Léopold Boilly (3 Mai 1801 in Paris – 8 December 1867 id., Petit-Montrouge) was a French engraver and lithographer.

Boilly was a son of the artist Louis-Léopold Boilly (1761–1845). He was a student of Alexandre Tardieu and François Forster.

His brothers Édouard Boilly (1799–1854) and Julien-Léopold Boilly (1796–1874) were also active as artists.

Bibliography 
 Émile Bellier de la Chavignerie, Louis Auvray: Dictionnaire général des artistes de l’école française depuis l’origine des arts du dessin jusqu’à nos jours. Bd. 1, Renouard, Paris 1882,  (Digitalisat).
 Henri Beraldi: Les Graveurs du XIXe siècle. Bd. 2, Conquet, Paris 1885,  (Digitalisat).

19th-century French engravers
19th-century French lithographers
19th-century French male artists
1801 births
1867 deaths
Artists from Paris